Javier Otano Cid (born 6 November 1946) is a Spanish politician and former President of Navarre between 1995 and 1996.

References

1946 births
Living people
Members of the 1st Parliament of Navarre
Members of the 2nd Parliament of Navarre
Members of the 3rd Parliament of Navarre
Members of the 4th Parliament of Navarre
Leaders of political parties in Spain
Politicians from Navarre
Presidents of the Government of Navarre
Presidents of the Parliament of Navarre
Spanish Socialist Workers' Party politicians